The men's 100 metres sprint event at the 1952 Olympic Games in Helsinki, Finland was held at the Olympic Stadium on 20 and 21 July. Seventy-two athletes from 33 nations competed; each nation was limited to 3 runners. The final was won by American Lindy Remigino, the fourth consecutive victory by a different American. Herb McKenley won Jamaica's first medal in the men's 100 metres with his silver, while McDonald Bailey's bronze put Great Britain on the podium for the first time since 1928. The final was "probably the closest mass finish in Olympic 100 metre history" with the first four runners all clocking in at 10.4 seconds hand-timed, all six finalists within 0.12 seconds electric-timed (10.79 for first, 10.91 for sixth), and a photo finish necessary to separate the winners.

Background
This was the twelfth time the event was held, having appeared at every Olympics since the first in 1896. None of the medalists from 1948 returned, but sixth-place finisher McDonald Bailey (who had recently tied the world record) did. London bronze medalist Lloyd LaBeach's brother Byron LaBeach represented Jamaica. Other notable entrants were American Art Bragg (who pulled his hamstring before the semifinal) and Jamaican Herb McKenley, who were favorites along with Bailey.

Bulgaria, Ghana, Guatemala, Israel, Nigeria, the Soviet Union, Thailand, and Venezuela were represented in the event for the first time. The United States was the only nation to have appeared at each of the first twelve Olympic men's 100 metres events.

Competition format

The event retained the four round format from 1920 to 1948: heats, quarterfinals, semifinals, and a final. There were 12 heats, of 4–7 athletes each, with the top 2 in each heat advancing to the quarterfinals. The 24 quarterfinalists were placed into 4 heats of 6 athletes. The top 3 in each quarterfinal advanced to the semifinals. There were 2 heats of 6 semifinalists, once again with the top 3 advancing to the 6-man final.

Records

Prior to the competition, the existing World and Olympic records were as follows.

Results

Heats

The fastest two runners in each of the twelve heats advanced to the quarterfinal round.

Heat 1

Heat 2

Heat 3

Heat 4

Heat 5

Heat 6

Heat 7

Heat 8

Heat 9

Heat 10

Heat 11

Heat 12

Quarterfinals

The fastest three runners in each of the four heats advanced to the semifinal round.

Quarterfinal 1

Quarterfinal 2

Quarterfinal 3

Quarterfinal 4

Semifinals

The fastest three runners in each of the two heats advanced to the final round.

Semifinal 1

Bragg tore a muscle in this semifinal.

Semifinal 2

Final

References

Athletics at the 1952 Summer Olympics
100 metres at the Olympics
Men's events at the 1952 Summer Olympics